Sirai Paravai is a 1987 Indian Tamil-language action drama film directed by Manobala and written by P. Kalaimani. The film stars Vijayakanth and Raadhika. It is a remake of the Telugu film Jailu Pakshi (1986), and was released on 14 January 1987.

Plot

Cast 
Vijayakanth as Rajasekaran
Raadhika as Valli
Baby Shalini
Malaysia Vasudevan
Vennira Aadai Moorthy
Senthil
Lakshmi

Production 
Vijayakanth was initially uninterested in doing the film as it was female centric, but after Kalaimani and Manobala promised to add more scenes featuring him, he agreed.

Soundtrack 
The music was composed by Ilaiyaraaja. "Paavam Oru" is the last song Vairamuthu wrote for Ilaiyaraaja. The song "Anandam Pongida" is set to the Carnatic raga Kharaharapriya.

References

External links 
 

1980s action drama films
1980s Tamil-language films
1987 films
Films directed by Manobala
Films scored by Ilaiyaraaja
Indian action drama films
Tamil remakes of Telugu films